Brigitte Martin is a French former figure skater who competed in ice dance. With her skating partner, Francis Gamichon, she won bronze at the 1967 European Figure Skating Championships in Ljubljana, Yugoslavia.

Competitive highlights

With Francis Gamichon

With Daniel Georget

References 

Living people
French female ice dancers
Year of birth missing (living people)
20th-century French women